is a Japanese actress and voice actress. She was born in Niigata Prefecture. She and fellow voice actor Akio Ōtsuka married on February 11, 2005, but they divorced three years later.

Filmography

Anime

Drama CDs

Video games

Dubbing

Live-action

Animation

References

External links
 Official agency profile 
 

1962 births
Living people
Japanese stage actresses
Japanese video game actresses
Japanese voice actresses
Mausu Promotion voice actors
Voice actresses from Niigata Prefecture
20th-century Japanese actresses
21st-century Japanese actresses